Jagged Thoughts is the third album by Oakland punk band American Steel. It was released in 2001 by Lookout Records. The album is a departure from their earlier releases, focusing less on aggressive ska-punk and showing a larger Clash influence.

Track listing
 "Shrapnel" – 4:28
 "New Religion Every Day" – 3:23
 "Rainy Day" – 4:11
 "There's a New Life" – 1:32
 "Lonely All the Time" – 4:42
 "Maria" – 4:52
 "Time Gone By" – 1:54
 "Turn It Out" – 2:29
 "Two Crooks" – 2:40
 "Wake Up Alone" – 2:44
 "I Don't Mind" – 5:13
 "Day To Night (Like a Hint)" – 5:34

American Steel albums
2001 albums
Lookout! Records albums